Kieran Sowden (born 17 August 1990) is an English volleyball player, a member of the club Team Northumbria.

Sporting achievements

Clubs 
English Cup:
  2014, 2016, 2017, 2018
English Championship:
  2016, 2017, 2018
  2014

References

External links
 Volleybox profile
 CEV profile

1990 births
Living people
English men's volleyball players